Events in the year 1612 in Norway.

Incumbents
Monarch: Christian IV

Events

Kalmar War: 
26 February – , 300 Norwegian soldiers are massacred inside a church in Nya Lödöse, Sweden.
July - August –  (Mönnichhoven-marsjen).
26 August – Battle of Kringen.
Fall – Swedish forces under Baltzar Bäck leaves Jemtland and Herjedalen, after being occupied since 1611.
The town of Konghelle was burned down by Swedish troops, then moved closer to Bohus Fortress, and renamed Kongelf.

Arts and literature

Births

Deaths
26 August – George Sinclair, mercenary (born c. 1580).

See also

References